is the fifth single by Japanese girl group Keyakizaka46. It was released on October 25, 2017, by Sony Music Japan.

Track listing 
All lyrics written by Yasushi Akimoto.

Charts

Weekly charts

Year-end charts

Certifications

References

Further reading

External links 
 Discography on the official website of Keyakizaka46
 

2017 singles
Keyakizaka46 songs
2017 songs
Songs with lyrics by Yasushi Akimoto
Sony Music Entertainment Japan singles
Oricon Weekly number-one singles
Billboard Japan Hot 100 number-one singles